Pine Knot is a census-designated place (CDP) in McCreary County, Kentucky, United States. The population was 1,680 at the 2000 census.

Geography
Pine Knot is located at  (36.661333, -84.440412).

Demographics

As of the census of 2000, there were 1,680 people, 584 households, and 390 families residing in the CDP. The racial makeup of the CDP was 90.95% White, 5.71% African American, 0.42% Native American, 0.06% Asian, 1.37% from other races, and 1.49% from two or more races. Hispanic or Latino of any race were 2.32% of the population.

There were 584 households, out of which 32.2% had children under the age of 18 living with them, 50.7% were married couples living together, 12.8% had a female householder with no husband present, and 33.2% were non-families. 30.5% of all households were made up of individuals, and 8.9% had someone living alone who was 65 years of age or older. The average household size was 2.39 and the average family size was 2.97.

In the CDP, the population was spread out, with 27.4% under the age of 18, 14.8% from 18 to 24, 22.4% from 25 to 44, 22.4% from 45 to 64, and 12.9% who were 65 years of age or older. The median age was 32 years. For every 100 females, there were 114.0 males. For every 100 females age 18 and over, there were 108.5 males.

The median income for a household in the CDP was $13,777, and the median income for a family was $20,313. Males had a median income of $19,539 versus $12,092 for females. The per capita income for the CDP was $8,715. About 31.2% of families and 38.5% of the population were below the poverty line, including 38.6% of those under age 18 and 13.7% of those age 65 or over.

Government and infrastructure
The Federal Bureau of Prisons United States Penitentiary, McCreary is in McCreary County, near Pine Knot.

Transportation
McCreary County Airport is located in the county, near Pine Knot.

References

Census-designated places in McCreary County, Kentucky
Census-designated places in Kentucky